The Tower is a commercial office skyscraper at Karet Semanggi, Setiabudi in South Jakarta, Indonesia. It is located at the Golden Triangle area of Jakarta, which is 211.8 meter tall, has 50 floors above & 5 floors below the ground.

See also
List of tallest buildings in Indonesia
List of tallest buildings in Jakarta

References

Buildings and structures in Jakarta
Skyscraper office buildings in Indonesia
Towers in Indonesia
Office buildings completed in 2016